Luca Brignoli (born 12 January 1983 in Bergamo) is an Italian football player, who currently plays for Albate Calcio at Seconda Categoria (9th level).

Career
In January 2008, he swapped club with Davide Zomer.

He has played for Bulgarian side Botev Plovdiv since mid-2009, leaving the team after it was administratively relegated in 2010.

References

External links
 Player Profile at tuttocalciatori.net

1983 births
Living people
Italian footballers
Association football goalkeepers
A.C. Ancona players
Ravenna F.C. players
Botev Plovdiv players
First Professional Football League (Bulgaria) players
Expatriate footballers in Bulgaria
Italian expatriates in Bulgaria
Association football midfielders